Marvin Philip (born February 3, 1982) is a former American football guard. He was drafted by the Pittsburgh Steelers in the sixth round of the 2006 NFL Draft. He played college football at California.

Philip has also been a member of the Cleveland Browns, Baltimore Ravens, New Orleans Saints, Buffalo Bills and Omaha Nighthawks.

Early years
He played football at San Mateo High School in San Mateo, California, and Oak Ridge High School in El Dorado Hills, California.

College career
Philip played college football at the University of California, Berkeley, interrupting school for two years to serve on a mission in the Dakotas for the Church of Jesus Christ of Latter-day Saints. He was an All-American in 2004 and 2005. He was also named the team's offensive MVP in his senior year.

Professional career
Philip was drafted in the sixth round of the 2006 NFL Draft by the Pittsburgh Steelers. He played in eight preseason games for Pittsburgh between 2006 and 2007, but never made the field in a regular season game. He was out of the NFL by 2008. Philip was signed by Omaha Nighthawks of the United Football League on August 21, 2010.

Personal life
Philip appeared as an entrepreneur on the October 5, 2012, episode of the ABC television show Shark Tank. He was seeking investors for his product, a specialized laundry hamper called Lifter Hamper. All of the "sharks" declined to invest. The product was later acquired & is currently sold globally by Honey-Can-Do, as the “Bounce Back Hamper”.

References

External links
Just Sports Stats
Buffalo Bills bio
Cleveland Browns bio
California Golden Bears bio

1982 births
Living people
American Latter Day Saints
People from San Mateo County, California
People from Redwood City, California
American football centers
American football offensive guards
California Golden Bears football players
Pittsburgh Steelers players
Cleveland Browns players
Baltimore Ravens players
New Orleans Saints players
Buffalo Bills players
Omaha Nighthawks players
Players of American football from California
Sportspeople from the San Francisco Bay Area
American people of Tongan descent